Ready!.. Aim!.. Fire!.. is a 1987 Filipino comedy film directed by Mike Relon Makiling and starring the comedy trio of Tito Sotto, Vic Sotto and Joey de Leon, as well as Joey Albert, Panchito Alba, Ike Lozada, Val Sotto, Mon Alvir, Zorayda Sanchez, and Evelyn Vargas. Produced by Cineventures, it was released on September 4, 1987. Critic Luciano E. Soriano of the Manila Standard gave the film a negative review, criticizing its plot, humor, and low production value.

Cast
Tito Sotto as Tyson
Vic Sotto as Sugar Ray
Joey de Leon as Hagler
Joey Albert as J.A.
Panchito Alba as Dong
Ike Lozada as General Hoto Tay
Val Sotto
Mon Alvir
Zorayda Sanchez
Evelyn Vargas
Vangie Labalan
German Moreno
Bella Flores
Bomber Moran as a hijacker
Charlon Davao
Bing "Temi" Angeles
Mildred Gamboa
Val Tito
Balot
Joaquin Fajardo
Larry Silva as Lauro Longhair

Release
Ready!.. Aim!.. Fire!.. was released on September 4, 1987.

Critical response
Luciano E. Soriano of the Manila Standard gave the film a negative review, criticizing its haphazardly-written plot, simplistic humor, and poor production value, all of which he assumes was due to a rushed production. He also noted the film's regular use of toilet humor, which he recognized is a staple for the lead trio's films, stating that "[i]t is offensive but the audience loves it just the same."

References

External links

1987 films
1987 comedy films
Filipino-language films
Films set in a fictional country
Military humor in film
Philippine comedy films
APT Entertainment films
Films directed by Mike Relon Makiling